ARST S.p.A., known also  as Azienda Regionale Sarda Trasporti, is a public company responsible for public transportation in Sardinia, in Italy, owned by the autonomous regional administration of Sardinia.

The company is headquartered in Cagliari and has 2,166 employees.
It operates a large part of the intercity bus lines on the island (it had 175 bus lines and a network of 13,500 km in 2007), urban bus lines in six municipalities (Alghero, Carbonia, Iglesias, Macomer, Guspini and Oristano), commuter and urban rail transport on 169 km of narrow gauge railways and on two metrotramways operating in Sassari and Cagliari. ARST operates also 438 km of narrow railways, based on 4 lines, used as a rail tourism service, called Trenino Verde.

Notes and references 

Transport companies of Italy
Transport in Sardinia